Khosrowabad (also Romanized as Khosrowābād) is a village in Javanmardi Rural District, Khanmirza District, Lordegan County, Chaharmahal and Bakhtiari Province, Iran. At the 2006 census, its population was 267, in 59 families. The village is populated by Lurs.

References 

Populated places in Lordegan County
Luri settlements in Chaharmahal and Bakhtiari Province